Neodrillia is a genus of sea snails, marine gastropod mollusks in the family Drilliidae.

Species
Species within the genus Neodrillia include:
 Neodrillia albicoma (Dall, 1889)
 Neodrillia blakensis (Tippett, 2007)
 Neodrillia crassa Fallon, 2016
 Neodrillia cydia Bartsch, 1943
 Neodrillia princeps Fallon, 2016
Species brought into synonymy
 Neodrillia antiguensis Bartsch, 1943: synonym of Neodrillia cydia Bartsch, 1943
 Neodrillia barbadensis Bartsch, 1943: synonym of Neodrillia cydia Bartsch, 1943
 Neodrillia blacki Petuch, 2003: synonym of Fenimorea moseri (Dall, 1889)
 Neodrillia encia Bartsch, 1943: synonym of Neodrillia cydia Bartsch, 1943
 Neodrillia euphanes (J.C. Melvill, 1923): synonym of Drillia euphanes J.C. Melvill, 1923
 Neodrillia jamaicensis Bartsch, 1943: synonym of Neodrillia cydia Bartsch, 1943

References

 Bartsch, P. "A review of some west Atlantic turritid mollusks." Memorias de la Sociedad Cubana de Historia Natural 17.2 (1943): 81-122.

External links
 Fallon P.J. (2016). Taxonomic review of tropical western Atlantic shallow water Drilliidae (Mollusca: Gastropoda: Conoidea) including descriptions of 100 new species. Zootaxa. 4090(1): 1-363

 
Gastropod genera